Senice na Hané is a municipality and village in Olomouc District in the Olomouc Region of the Czech Republic. It has about 1,800 inhabitants.

Administrative parts
Villages of Cakov and Odrlice are administrative parts of Senice na Hané.

References

Villages in Olomouc District